Mitchell Henry is a financier.

Mitchell Henry may also refer to:
 Mitchell Henry (American football), American football player
 Mitchell Henry (footballer), English association footballer